In Australia, baseball is a game that is played in all states and territories of the country.

History

Baseball was believed to have been brought to Australia with American gold miners in the Victorian gold rush of the 1850s, where miners would play baseball on the gold fields on their rest days.

In 1867, Victorian cricketers William Gaggin and Louis Goldsmith tried to set up a game of baseball at Yarra Park but were disrupted by fans arriving for a local Australian football match. The first competitive series was played between the Surry Baseball Club and members of the New South Wales Cricket Association over June/July 1878. However, it is argued competitive organised one-off matches from as early as 1875 were played before this time.

The first interstate baseball games were played in 1890 when Victoria played South Australia at the East Melbourne Cricket Ground. The visitors won the best of three series 16–14, 27–18 and 22–26 in Melbourne. These two states in 1897 formed the first Australia representative baseball team which toured the United States on what became known as the Kangaroo Tour.

The Australian team sponsored by Mr A.J. Roberts with £1,500 was selected to tour the United States. They were outclassed by the home teams, winning only eight of their first 26 games. The Americans were surprised to note the Australian outfielders did not wear gloves. Many of the tourists relied on friends and relatives to get them home as the organisers ran out of credit to send them back home.

Those players on the team who could afford it continued on to tour England. Games were billed as Australia vs England and were played at the Crystal Palace Sports Ground, although the tour turned sour when the team manager left London with the gate receipts, leaving many more players in financial limbo. This set the game back several years in Victoria and South Australia; however, it continued to flourish in New South Wales where the sport was established as a winter sport through the New South Wales Winter League in 1898.

The first Australian championships were in 1910 in Hobart, Tasmania between New South Wales, Victoria and Tasmania and won by NSW. This was followed by a similar series in Melbourne, Victoria between Victoria, NSW, South Australia and Tasmania in August 1910. NSW also won this series.

In December 1888, an American, Albert Spalding, brought his Chicago White Stockings and a team of U.S. all-stars to Australia, as part of a world tour. Sydney Cricket Ground hosted three games.

At the end of the 19th century, Americans also tried to set up baseball leagues and competitions in Australia, with some success. A national league was initiated in 1934, and the national team entered World Championship competition in the late 1970s. Prior to winning the silver medal at the 2004 Olympic Games in Athens, Australia had finished 7th in the Olympics twice, which is also the highest position reached in World Championships.

In the late 1980s to late 1990s the national league took off, with most capital cities having a team. The games were broadcast weekly on ABC television around the country. In the 12 months to March 1995 baseball hit its peak attendance rates with 133,000 people, equivalent to 0.9% of Australians over 15, having attended a baseball game that year. This was just under the attendance of golf and above outdoor hockey and lawn bowls.

A national-level competition still exists, as well as lower-level club competitions, but the game attracts comparatively little or no spectator or media interest. Several Australians, however, have attracted the attention of American scouts and have gone on to play in the major leagues in the United States and Japan.

Although baseball remains a fringe sport at adult level, it has experienced explosive growth at the youth level in the 21st century. The first Little League Baseball-affiliated league in the country was established in 2007. By mid-2012, the number of Little Leagues in the country had risen to about 400, making Australia the largest country in Little League participation outside of North America. This growth led the parent organisation to announce that Australia would receive an automatic berth in the Little League World Series starting in 2013.

Baseball Associations and Leagues
Baseball Australia
Australian Baseball League

Baseball Victoria
Baseball Victoria Summer League
Melbourne Winter Baseball League
Geelong Baseball Association
Ballarat Baseball Association
Dandenong Baseball Association
Latrobe Valley Baseball Association
North Eastern Baseball Association
Bendigo Baseball Association
Sunraysia Baseball League

Baseball NSW
New South Wales Major League
Macarthur Baseball League
Sydney Winter Baseball League
NSW Women's League
Country NSW League
Central Coast Baseball Association
Coffs Harbour Baseball
Pacific Coast League
Hastings Baseball Association
Tamworth Baseball Association
Shoalhaven Baseball Association
Wagga Baseball Association
Newcastle League
Illawarra League
Far North Coast League

Baseball Queensland
Greater Brisbane League
Gold Coast Baseball Association
Baseball Association Townsville
Cairns Baseball League
Southern Queensland Winter Baseball League

Baseball SA
South Australian Baseball League
Super League Baseball Adelaide
SA Winterball Association
Port Pirie Night Baseball League
Riverland Baseball League

Canberra Baseball
Canberra Baseball League

Baseball NT
Alice Springs Baseball Association
Darwin Baseball League

Baseball TAS
Hobart Summer Baseball League
Launceston Baseball League

Baseball WA
State League

Summer vs Winter
Baseball is considered traditionally a summer sport, meaning such that it will start in spring and end in autumn, however, this has changed many times in Australia for different reasons. One of these reasons is because baseball in Australia was originally considered a sport for cricketers in the off-season, but as baseball became more popular as a standalone sport it was played more often in summer. The Claxton Shield was traditionally played in the Australian winter so Sheffield Shield players could participate.

However, the Australian Baseball League, International Baseball League of Australia and Claxton Shield in recent years have been played in the Australian summer, this is due to the MLB and other northern hemisphere baseball leagues being played in the northern summer, therefore many high-profile players from Australia were unable to play in the southern winter.

Both summer and winter baseball was played in Melbourne in the 1920s and Sydney from  until the end of World War II, when baseball across Australia became mainly winter only. During the late 1960s the trend swung back towards baseball's traditional season of summer.

When the New South Wales Major League decided to play summer only day baseball in 1973, a breakaway Sydney Winter League formed to continue playing in winter, while most NSW country centres continued in the winter. The Victorian Baseball Association in Melbourne switched to summer only in mid-1970. Since 1974 Sydney Baseball is now indeed an all year round sport.

Notable players

There are many Australians playing baseball professionally in the United States, Japan, Korea, and various other countries.
As of December 2021 there were 4 Australian players playing in MLB:

 Liam Hendriks – Chicago White Sox
 Lewis Thorpe – Minnesota Twins
 Alexander Wells – Baltimore Orioles
 Aaron Whitefield – Minnesota Twins

Graeme Lloyd was the first Australian World Series Champion winning with both the 1996 and 1998 Yankees, he is one of Six Australians to play post-season MLB Games (as at December 2021):

 Grant Balfour – Tampa Bay Rays
 Liam Hendriks – Chicago White Sox
 Graeme Lloyd – New York Yankees
 Damian Moss – Atlanta Braves
 Peter Moylan – Atlanta Braves
 Joe Quinn – Boston Beaneaters

Secondary school level

Australian Schools Championships
The Australian Schools Championships for baseball, also informally named at all levels 'schoolboys', is an annual secondary school tournament that has been officially running since 1989. It includes an Open and U-15 tournament. Currently New South Wales, Victoria, South Australia, Queensland, Western Australia and the ACT compete in the Championship.

Teams are picked by their state's school sport association from their respective schoolboys state titles. It also provides an opportunity for the Australia national schoolboy baseball team to be picked.

Champions

1989 – Victoria
1990 – Victoria                                    
1991 – New South Wales                     
1992 – New South Wales                     
1993 – New South Wales                      
1994 – Queensland                 
1995 – Victoria                                        
1996 – Victoria                                     
1997 – New South Wales        
1998 – New South Wales                    
1999 – New South Wales                     
2000 – New South Wales                       
2001 – New South Wales                       
2002 – Victoria                                     
2003 – New South Wales                    
2004 – Western Australia                       
2005 – Victoria                                       
2006 – New South Wales2007 – Queensland                                
2008 – Western Australia2009 – Victoria2010 – New South Wales2011 – New South Wales2012 – Victoria2013 – New South Wales2014 – New South Wales2015 – New South Wales2016 – Western Australia2017 – New South Wales2018 – New South Wales2019 – New South Wales'''

Past Competitions
Geelong 2007 – From 6 to 12 May 2007 the Championship was held in Geelong, Victoria at the Geelong Baseball Park.
The eventual tournament winner was Queensland, defeating New South Wales 3–1 in the final.
Lismore 2008 – The 2008 tournament was held in Lismore, New South Wales at Albert Park from 4 to 10 May 2008.
Western Australia won the event defeating New South Wales 5–0 in the final.
Canberra 2009 – In 2009, the tournament was held in Canberra, Australian Capital Territory from 4–9 May. In one of the most tightly contested championships of recent years, the Victorian side came out on top, defeating NSW 5–3 in the final on Saturday. Leading 3-0 early in the final, NSW fell victim to Victorian reliever Thomas Shaw who shut out his opponents the rest of the game – giving his team a chance of a thrilling comeback that they provided in turn. For NSW the honours were shared, but some brilliant work in the field from shortstop Jacob Younis kept his side close enough to bring the tying run to the plate in the last inning. That was as close as the team got, as it took Victorian closer Andrew Jones just the one pitch to finish the game and bring the title back to Victoria – their first since 2005 and 7th in the history of the tournament. In addition to team heroics, the tournament also played host to a raft of standout individual performances – culminating in the naming of the 2009 Australian Schools Team that will tour North America later this year under the guidance of Head Coach Stuart Hanrahan, assistants Chris Norrie and Brendon Wallace and tour Manager Neil Barrowcliff.
Perth 2010 – The 2010 tournament was played a week later than usual and at Perth, meaning many states sent a weakened squad due to the geographic location of Perth in relation to the rest of Australia and that Major League Baseball Australian Academy Program was due to start earlier in the year. New South Wales sent a roster far stronger than any of the other states and dominated the tournament, winning all eight matches and scoring an average of 12 runs per game. They defeated Australian Capital Territory in the final 10–5. Individual standouts were Luke Parish from New South Wales, who batted .524 and Colin Tilini (1-0) also from NSW who pitched 8.1 scoreless innings in two appearances, striking out 11.

See also

 List of baseball teams in Australia
 Australian Baseball Federation
 Baseball Australia Hall of Fame
 Baseball at the Australian University Games
 Baseball awards#Australia
Tee-ball

References

Bibliography

External links
 Timeline
 OzBall at Hunterlink